Collix brevipalpis is an African moth in the  family Geometridae. It is found in Equatorial Guinea, specifically the island of Bioko. Its species name refers to the shortness of its palpi.

References

Moths described in 1999
brevipalpis
Moths of Africa
Fauna of Bioko